Ormocarpopsis tulearensis is a species of flowering plant in the family Fabaceae. It is found only in Madagascar.

References

tulearensis
Endemic flora of Madagascar
Endangered plants
Taxonomy articles created by Polbot